Paterno may refer to:

Places
 Paterno, Basilicata, Italy
 Paternò, Catania, Sicily, Italy
 Paterno Calabro, Cosenza, Calabria, Italy
 The Paterno, a Manhattan apartment building
 Monte Paterno, a mountain
 Paterno Castle, in Albaladejo, Spain
 Paterno Castle, a ruin in Civita Castellana, Italy, deathplace of Otto III, Holy Roman Emperor
 Paterno Castle (New York City), a former castle in upper Manhattan

People
Paterno (surname)

Other
A.S.D. Paternò 1908, Italian football club
Paterno (film), a 2018 film about the American football coach

Italian-language surnames